The Tītī / Muttonbird Islands are located near Stewart Island in the far south of New Zealand. The islands are not permanently inhabited, and are named for the traditional seasonal harvesting ("muttonbirding") of the sooty shearwater by Māori. These birds are known as "muttonbirds" due to their supposedly mutton-like taste.

History 
In May 2006, the north-eastern chain was the scene of tragedy when the fishing boat Kotuku capsized with the loss of six lives, close to Women's Island.

Description 
There are three chains, collectively referred to as the Muttonbird or Titi Islands. (The islands' official name is "Titi/Muttonbird Islands"). The north-eastern chain lies in Foveaux Strait, to the north-east of Stewart Island, between it and Ruapuke Island. A small eastern chain, south of Stewart Island's East Cape, also goes by the name of the Breaksea Islands. The southern chain lies to the south-west of Stewart Island.

Islands 
North-eastern chain  North, Women's, Edwards, Jacky Lee, Herekopare and Kanetetoe Islands; The Bunker Islets, and Fish Rock.

Eastern chain  Rukawahakura, Takawini, Potuatua, Pomatakiarehua, Kaihuka and Wharepuaitaha Islands.

Southern, or south-western, chain  Four distinct groups of islands make up the south-western chain. Close to Stewart island's south-westernmost point is Taukihepa/Big South Cape Island, close to which lie Poutama, Putauhina, Solomon, Kaimohu, Pukaparara, Tamaitemioka and Pohowaitai Islands and the Putauhina Nuggets. In the open sea 8 km to the north lie Big Moggy, Little Moggy and Mokinui Islands. To the east of these, close to Stewart Island, the 'Boat Group' consists of Big, Kundy, Betsy and Rat Islands. To the south of these lie the small rocky islets of The Brothers. The southern Muttonbird Islands have been identified as an Important Bird Area by BirdLife International because of their significance as a breeding site for sooty shearwaters, with over a million breeding pairs, and mottled petrels.

See also

 List of islands of New Zealand
 List of islands
 Desert island

References

External links 
 Migration of sooty shearwater from New Zealand to the north Pacific – TerraNature article
 The University of Otago Tītī Project
 Titi, the sooty shearwater. Description

Uninhabited islands of New Zealand
Islands of Southland, New Zealand
Stewart Island
Important Bird Areas of New Zealand
Foveaux Strait